Formosan may refer to various things associated with the island of Taiwan (formerly called Formosa):

 Taiwanese people who lived on the island before 1945, and their descendants
 Taiwanese indigenous peoples, descendents of inhabitants of the island before Chinese settlement
 Formosan languages, the languages of the indigenous people of the island
 Formosan black bear, a species endemic to the island
 Formosan Mountain Dog, a breed of dog commonly referred to as Formosan

See also
 Formosa (disambiguation)